Jagnjenica is a village in Zubin Potok, Kosovo.

History
During World War II, Jagnjenica was among the villages in North Kosovo that was burned down by Albanian paramilitaries and the Serb population expelled.

Notes

References

Villages in Zubin Potok
Zubin Potok